Mawlud Mukhlis, born in Mosul in 1886 and died in Beirut, Lebanon in 1951, was an Arab nationalist, soldier and Iraqi politician. He headed the Chamber of Deputies of Iraq from December 1937 to November 1941.

Biography
He joined the Covenant Society in 1914–15, commanded the Ottoman cavalry at the Battle of Shaiba and the Siege of Kut, and was subsequently arrested by the Ottomans on charges of spying for Britain. After escaping arrest, he joined the Arab Revolt.

He successfully defending Wadi Musa when Turkish forces under the command of Mehmed Djemal Pasha attacked on 21 October 1917, in the Battle of Wadi Musa.

He later became aide-de-camp to Faisal during the Arab Kingdom of Syria period. In 1919–20, he became the governor of occupied Zor.

He participated in the 1920 Iraqi revolt against the British, served as governor of Karbala in 1923, and was appointed to the Senate of Iraq by King Faisal in 1925. He won a seat in the parliament in the 1936–1937 Iraqi parliamentary election, and again in 1939 and 1943.

References

Iraqi politicians
1886 births
1951 deaths
People from Mosul
Presidents of the Chamber of Deputies of Iraq
Iraqi Arab nationalists
World War I spies for the United Kingdom